Fiona Adams (26 September 1935 – 26 June 2020) was a British photographer. She is most well known for her photograph of the Beatles jumping in the air which featured on the Twist and Shout EP cover. In the 1960s she photographed musicians of the day including Jimi Hendrix, Billy Fury, Cilla Black, Adam Faith, Bob Dylan, Sandie Shaw.

Early life 
Adams was born on 26 September 1935 in London, daughter of Freda (née Pattinson) and Philip Clarke, both professional musicians.

The family ran a guest house on the Channel Island of Guernsey. Due to World War Two in 1941 the family left Guernsey and returned in 1946. Adams attended The Ladies College at St Peter's Port. She studied photography at the Ealing School of Art, graduating in 1955.

Career 
Adams worked for photographer Douglas Glass for 7 months after graduating. This was followed by a role as photographer assistant in London County Council architectural department for four years. After working in Australia for two years she returned to England in 1961. Adams was briefly married in Australia.

As a temp job she began photographing pop and cultural celebrities for Boyfriend magazine, and a year later worked at Fabulous magazine. In 1967 she began photographing for American Express.

Later life 
Adams married Owen Le Tissier in 1972. They had two children.

She returned to Guernsey in the 1980s, and continued to work as a professional photographer.

The 2009–2010 National Portrait Gallery exhibition Beatles to Bowie: the 60s Exposed included work by Adams.

Owen died in 2011. She died in Guernsey in June 2020.

References 

1935 births
2020 deaths
20th-century British photographers
20th-century English women artists
21st-century British photographers
21st-century English women artists
British women photographers
Alumni of Ealing Art College
Photographers from London